Skövde IK is an ice hockey club from Skövde, Sweden that was founded in 1957.  The club played one season in Allsvenskan, Sweden's second-highest hockey league, in 2004–05.  , they compete in Division 1, the third tier of ice hockey in Sweden.

External links
Official homepage
Profile on Eliteprospects.com

Ice hockey teams in Sweden
Sport in Skövde
Ice hockey clubs established in 1957
1957 establishments in Sweden
Ice hockey teams in Västra Götaland County